Field hockey at the 2020 Summer Olympics in Tokyo took place from 24 July to 6 August 2021 at the Oi Seaside Park. Twenty-four teams (twelve each for men and women) competed in the tournament.

It was originally scheduled to be held in 2020, but on 24 March 2020, the Olympics were postponed to 2021 due to the COVID-19 pandemic.

Schedule

Qualification
Each of the Continental Champions from five confederations received an automatic berth. Japan as the host nation qualified automatically. In addition, the remaining six nations were to be determined by an olympic qualification event. As Japan emerged as Asian champion in both men's and women's events, a seventh berth was made available in each qualification event. Although the qualification was unaffected by the COVID-19 pandemic.

Men

Women

Medal summary

Medal table

Medalists

Men's tournament

The competition consisted of two stages; a group stage followed by a knockout stage.

Group stage
Teams were divided into two groups of six nations, playing every team in their group once. Three points were awarded for a victory, one for a draw. The top four teams per group will qualify to the quarter-finals.

Group A

Group B

Knockout stage

Final standings

Women's tournament

The competition consisted of two stages; a group stage followed by a knockout stage.

Group stage
Teams were divided into two groups of six nations, playing every team in their group once. Three points are awarded for a victory, one for a draw. The top four teams per group will qualify for the quarter-finals.

Group A

Group B

Knockout stage

Final standings

See also
Field hockey at the 2018 Asian Games
Field hockey at the 2018 Summer Youth Olympics
Field hockey at the 2019 Pan American Games

References

External links
 Results book 

 
Field hockey at the Summer Olympics
2020 Summer Olympics events
Summer Olympics
2020 Summer Olympics